Graham Law is a former professional rugby league footballer who played in the 1990s and 2000s.

Genealogical Information
Graham Law is the brother of the rugby union, and rugby league footballer; Neil Law.

References

External links
Saints subdue plucky Wildcats
Giants live to fight on
Super League preview
Halifax halt Trinity charge
Wakefield hit by injuries
Bulls tame ailing Wildcats
Wildcats ease to Wolves win
Broncos recover for narrow win
Wolves keep Wildcats at bay
Salford revival continues
Wakefield Trinity Wildcats

Living people
English rugby league players
Place of birth missing (living people)
Rugby league centres
Rugby league five-eighths
Rugby league locks
Rugby league players from Sheffield
Rugby league second-rows
Wakefield Trinity players
Year of birth missing (living people)